Ceratinopsidis is a monotypic genus of North American dwarf spiders containing the single species, Ceratinopsidis formosa. It was first described by S. C. Bishop & C. R. Crosby in 1930, and has only been found in United States.

See also
 List of Linyphiidae species

References

Linyphiidae
Monotypic Araneomorphae genera
Spiders of the United States